SOKO Donau (in Germany SOKO Wien) is an Austrian crime drama television series produced by ORF in collaboration with the German network ZDF. It is the sixth spin-off of the German crime series SOKO 5113 (SOKO München since 2015), launched in 1978. The show, which debuted on 20 September 2005 in Austria and 18 October 2005 in Germany, focuses on a Viennese police team responsible for investigating crimes committed on the Danube (German: Donau) river and its tributaries. The boat team operates in and around Vienna as well as Lower and Upper Austria, sometimes travelling all the way to Bratislava.

Crossover
A crossover episode with Leipzig Homicide, titled "Der vierte Mann", was broadcast on ORF on 2 November 2019 and ZDF on 8 November 2019. The screenplay was based on a true story related to the Viennese political activist Rudolfine Steindling.

Cast and characters
Current

See also
 List of Austrian television series

References

External links
 
 Soko Wien at ZDF

ORF (broadcaster) original programming
Austrian crime television series
2005 Austrian television series debuts
2000s Austrian television series
2010s Austrian television series
Austrian television spin-offs
German-language television shows